Timothy A. Sejba (born March 7, 1972) is a United States Space Force brigadier general who serves as the program executive officer for both the Space Domain Awareness and Combat Power (SDACP); and Battle Management, Command, Control, and Communications (BMC3) directorates. He has also served as acting director of the Space Rapid Capabilities Office from 2018 to 2019.

In January 2021, Sejba was nominated for promotion to brigadier general in the United States Air Force and his nomination was confirmed, but in June 2021, he was nominated for transfer to the Space Force as a colonel. In December 2021, he was again nominated for promotion to brigadier general, this time in the Space Force, and was promoted on December 21, 2021, a week after his confirmation.

Education 

 1995 Distinguished Graduate, Air Force Reserve Officer Training Corps, Detachment 420, Duluth, Minn. 
 1995 Bachelor of Computer Engineering, University of Minnesota-Duluth, Duluth, Minn. 
 2001 Masters in Business Administration, San Jose State University, San Jose, Calif. 
 2001 Squadron Officer School (Correspondence), Maxwell AFB, Ala. 
 2002 Squadron Officer School (Residence), Maxwell AFB, Ala. 
 2003 California Institute of Technology Systems Engineering Certificate, Los Angeles AFB, Calif. 
 2005 Air Command and Staff College (Correspondence), Maxwell AFB, Ala. 
 2006 Joint Forces Staff College, Norfolk, Va. 
 2009 Air Force Fellow (Residence), United States Senate, Washington, D.C. 
 2012 Air War College (Correspondence), Maxwell AFB, Ala. 
 2013 Dwight D. Eisenhower School for National Security and Resource Strategy, National Defense University, Ft. McNair, Washington, D.C. 
 2013 Senior Acquisition Course, Ft. McNair, Washington, D.C. 
 2018 U.S. Air Force Enterprise Seminar, Kenan-Flagler Business School, University of North Carolina, Chapel Hill, N.C.
 2019 Executive Program Managers Course, Defense Acquisition University, Ft. Belvoir, Va.

Assignments 

1. June 1995–October 1997, Master Control Station Systems Engineer, and Chief, Command Section, 2nd Space Operations Squadron, Falcon AFB, Colo.
2. October 1997–March 2002, Flight Commander, Chief, Standardization and Evaluation, Senior FlightCommander, and Executive Officer, Operating Division Four – National Reconnaissance Office, Onizuka AFS, Calif.
3. March 2002–July 2005, Project Manager, Space-Based Systems, and Deputy Program Manager, Space Superiority Materiel Wing, Space and Missile Systems Center, Los Angeles AFB, Calif.
4. July 2005–June 2008, Chief, Position, Navigation and Timing Operations, and Executive Officer, USSTRATCOM Joint Functional Component Command, Global Strike and Integration; Chief, Special Programs, USSTRATCOM/J32, Offutt AFB, Neb.
5. July 2008–December 2008, Air Force Fellow, AF/A9, Pentagon, Washington, D.C.
6. January 2009–December 2009, Air Force Legislative Fellow for Senator Mary Landrieu, Louisiana, United States Senate, Washington, D.C.
7. January 2010–June 2010, Space, Nuclear and Cyber Congressional Liaison, Pentagon, Washington, D.C.
8. July 2010–June 2012, Commander, Space Operations Squadron, Aerospace Data Facility-Southwest, National Reconnaissance Office, Las Cruces, N.M.
9. August 2012–June 2013, Student, Dwight D. Eisenhower School for National Security and Resource Strategy, National Defense University, Ft. McNair, Washington, D.C.
10. June 2013–June 2014, Chief, Weapons and Capabilities Office, Defense Threat Reduction Agency, Eglin AFB, Fla.
11. June 2014–July 2016, Commander, Technology Operations Group, Communications Directorate, National Reconnaissance Office, Chantilly, Va.
12. July 2016–July 2018, Deputy Director, Military Satellite Communications Systems Directorate, Space and Missile Systems Center, Los Angeles AFB, Calif. 
13. July 2018–February 2019, Acting Director, Space Rapid Capabilities Office, Kirtland AFB, N.M.
14. July 2018–July 2020, Director, Advanced Systems and Development Directorate, Space and Missile Systems Center, Kirtland AFB, N.M.
15. July 2020–August 2021, Program Executive Officer for Space Development, Space and Missile Systems Center, Los Angeles AFB, Calif.
16. August 2021–March 2022, Program Executive Officer for Space Enterprise and Director Enterprise Corps, Space Systems Command, Los Angeles AFB, Calif.
17. March 2022–present, Program Executive Officer for Space Domain Awareness and Combat Power; Program Executive Officer for Battle Management Command, Control, and Communications, Los Angeles AFB, Calif.

Awards and decorations 

Sejba is the recipient of the following awards:

 2002 Space and Missile Systems Center CGO of the Year
 2005 Air Force Engineering Team of the Year
 2012 NRO Director’s Circle Award for Leadership
 2014 DoD CIO Team of the Year
 2018 Secretary Wilson Program Office of the Year

Dates of promotion

Writings

References 

Living people
United States Space Force generals
1972 births